The 1992 Pacific typhoon season had no official bounds; it ran year-round in 1992. Despite this, most tropical cyclones tend to form in the northwestern Pacific Ocean between May and November. These dates conventionally delimit the period of each year when most tropical cyclones form in the northwestern Pacific Ocean.

In the West Pacific basin, tropical depressions have the "W" suffix added to their number. Storms reaching tropical storm intensity of  sustained winds were assigned a name by the Joint Typhoon Warning Center (JTWC). Storms with sustained winds exceeding  are called typhoons, while intense typhoons with sustained winds exceeding  are designated super typhoons by the JTWC (see tropical cyclone scales).

Furthermore, tropical depressions that enter or form in the Philippine Area of Responsibility  are assigned an internal name by the Philippine Atmospheric, Geophysical and Astronomical Services Administration (PAGASA). This can often result in the same storm having two names.

Season summary

There were a total of 40 tropical cyclones in the Western Pacific in 1992. 39 of these formed within the basin, and 1 storm, Tropical Storm Ekeka, formed in the Central Pacific basin, crossing the Date Line to enter the Western Pacific. Out of the 39, 32 became named tropical storms, 21 reached typhoon intensity, and 5 reached super typhoon strength. Storms are listed in numerical ascending order by their JTWC tropical depression numbers except for Ekeka, and not in alphabetical order of names. Thus, Tropical Storm Zack (22W) is listed before Super Typhoon Yvette (23W).

The season was hyperactive, featuring the highest Accumulated cyclone energy for a Pacific typhoon season on record at the time, until it was surpassed by the 1997 Pacific typhoon season.

Systems

Severe Tropical Storm Axel

Axel formed as a tropical storm on January 4. It then curved and reached tropical storm strength. Axel continued to intensify, and it reached its peak as a severe tropical storm. Then, Axel weakened to a tropical storm. Axel continued to weak further until it was a tropical depression. It curved northeast until it was dissipated on January 15.

Tropical Storm Ekeka

On February 3, Hurricane Ekeka entered the basin as a moderately strong tropical storm. Ekeka began to weaken into a low-end tropical storm, then to a tropical depression on February 4. On February 8, JMA noticed that Ekeka dissipated, but the JTWC continued to track the system until February 9.

Typhoon Bobbie (Asiang)

Bobbie formed as a tropical storm on June 22 east of Philippines. Then it curved northwest and intensified into a tropical storm. A few days later, it intensified into a category 1 hurricane. Later, it was upgraded into a category 2 typhoon, then it was greatly intensified on a category 4 typhoon. Subsequently, it weakened into a category 3 typhoon. Later, it was already a category 2 typhoon. Bobbie weakened further, as it was in a category 1 typhoon then a tropical storm. Bobbie landed in southeast Japan as a tropical storm, then dissipated on June 30.

Throughout Japan, damage reached 371.8 million yen ($2.9 million).

Typhoon Chuck (Biring)

When  Typhoon Chuck hit southern Hainan Island and northern Vietnam on June 28 and 29, it brought heavy flooding.

At least seven people were killed by Typhoon Chuck and nine others were reported missing. Damage in China amounted to $36.4 million.

Tropical Depression Deanna

Deanna re-curved out to sea.

Typhoon Eli (Konsing)

One person was killed and eight others were reported missing when the storm moved through the Philippines. Extensive damage took place in China with losses amounting to $235 million.

Tropical Storm Faye

Two people were killed in Hong Kong.

Severe Tropical Storm Gary (Ditang)

At least 48 people were killed by Gary. Extensive damage took place in China with losses reaching $940 million.

Tropical Storm Helen

Helen moved north away from land.

Severe Tropical Storm Irving (Edeng)

Three people were killed and damage reached 64 million yen ($835,000).

Typhoon Janis (Gloring)

In Japan, Typhoon Janis killed two people and injured 41 others. Total losses from the storm reached 5.8 billion yen ($45.6 million).

Typhoon Kent

Kent formed on August 5 in the Federated States of Micronesia. Then, it tracked northwest and was intensified into a tropical storm. Then, it was upgraded into a category 1 typhoon. A few days later, the JTWC upgraded Kent into a category 2 typhoon. Then, Kent intensified into a category 3 then to a category 4 typhoon. Kent reached its peak intensity as a super typhoon. Afterwards, Kent moved very slowly. Then, the JTWC downgraded Kent into a category 4 typhoon then to a category 3 typhoon. Kent still moved slowly. Afterwards, the JTWC downgraded Kent into a category 2 typhoon. However, it still moved slowly until it was downgraded into a category 1 typhoon. Afterwards, the JTWC downgraded Kent into a tropical storm. Kent moved northeastwards then affected Japan. After it affected Japan, it weakened into a tropical depression then dissipated on the Sea of Japan.

When Kent was traveling towards Japan, its large waves swept five people on the sea. Overall, Kent caused five deaths.

Tropical Storm Lois (Huaning)

Lois moved northeast away from Japan.

Tropical Storm Mark

One person was killed and another reported missing. Losses reached $10.4 million.

Tropical Storm Nina

Nina curved away from land.

Typhoon Omar (Lusing)

Typhoon Omar originated into a tropical disturbance on August 20. On those days, the basin saw the dissipation of 2 tropical cyclones and another two more cyclones that begin their extratropical transition. The system intensified, prompting JMA and JTWC to name the Tropical depression 15W. 15W tracked westward, and it intensified to a tropical storm then was named Omar by the JMA. Omar begin to track westward, causing the outflow of Tropical Storm Polly to shear the system and slowing intensification. Then JTWC noticed that the wind shear can weaken Omar. The two storms furthered apart, allowing a ridge to develop between them. This caused Omar to drift slowly on the north, and because of the decreasing wind shear, Omar resumed strengthening. The storm later resumed its west-northwest track. On August 27, JTWC designed the storm as a typhoon, developing an eye. This intensity remained for 24 hours before it weakened. Two days later, Omar entered the PAR and PAGASA assigned the local name Lusing. On September 3, Omar weakened into a tropical storm by JMA, but JTWC maintained the storm at the typhoon strength. The storm still tracked westward, then made landfall on east coast of Taiwan. Then it made its final landfall near Fujian in Eastern China on September 5. Then it degenerated to a tropical depression before turning west-southwest. Then it moved on southern China as a weak system, dissipating on September 9 on northern Vietnam.

Typhoon Omar was a destructive storm to Guam, causing over a foot of rain there, amounting to $702 million in damage (2008 USD) and a death. In Taiwan, the storm caused 2 deaths and heavy rainfall, which warranted the name's retirement. The name Omar was replaced with Oscar which was first used in the 1995 season.

Severe Tropical Storm Polly (Isang)

Developing to Omar's west, Polly began its life on August 23 and reached tropical storm strength on the 26th. As a developing monsoon depression, it had a large outflow. Polly retained that throughout its lifetime, inhibiting intensification past  winds. On the 30th, the storm hit southeastern Taiwan, and on the 31st it hit China.

Torrential rains produced by Tropical Storm Polly triggered devastating floods that killed 202 people and injured hundreds more. More than 5 million people were left homeless across Fujian and Zhejiang Provinces in China. Total losses from the storm were roughly $450 million.

Typhoon Ryan

Ryan was a potent typhoon that passed east of Japan.

Typhoon Sibyl

Sibyl did not affect land.

Severe Tropical Storm Ted (Maring)

Tropical Storm Ted, having developed on September 14, stalled off northern Luzon on the 20th. It turned northward, and hit southern Taiwan on the 22nd as a minimal typhoon. Ted weakened to a tropical storm over the island, and hit eastern China on the 23rd. It turned to the northeast, hit South Korea, and became extratropical on the 24th.

At least 61 people were killed by Typhoon Ted and 51 others were reported missing. Losses from the storm reached $360 million in China.

Tropical Storm Val

Val stayed at sea.

Typhoon Ward

On September 23, a tropical depression developed just east of the International Dateline; however, it was warned upon by the Joint Typhoon Warning Center rather than the Central Pacific Hurricane Center as it was expected to become a significant tropical cyclone outside of the CPHC's area of responsibility. Just prior to crossing into the Western Pacific basin, it reached tropical storm intensity, at which time it was given the name Ward from the list of Pacific typhoon names. The storm eventually weakened as it moved through higher latitudes, becoming extratropical on October 7 over open waters.

Typhoon Yvette (Ningning)

Yvette was a recurving super typhoon.

Tropical Storm Zack

Zack stayed away from land.

Typhoon Angela (Osang)

At least 49 people were killed by Typhoon Angela, mostly in Vietnam, while 14 others were reported missing.

Typhoon Brian

Brian caused small damage in Guam, but no deaths were reported.

Severe Tropical Storm Colleen (Paring)

Colleen intensified over the South China Sea before making landfall in Vietnam.

Typhoon Dan

Dan came nowhere near land.

Typhoon Elsie (Reming)

Elsie recurved away from land.

Tropical Depression 29W

On October 30, a tropical disturbance began to form west of the International Date Line. The JTWC then issued a Tropical Cyclone Formation Alert late the next day as the system moved westward and started warnings on Tropical Depression 29W on November 1. However, intensification was severely inhibited by outflow from nearby Typhoon Dan, and the depression failed to develop. It passed within  of Wake Island, causing a minor pressure dip and gusts to 32 kn (60 km/h). No damage was reported, due to the relative weakness of 29W as compared to Dan, which ravaged the island 3 days earlier. The depression dissipated on November 2 over open ocean.

Tropical Storm Forrest

On November 8 a tropical depression formed from the monsoon trough east of the Philippines. It crossed the islands, and strengthened to a tropical storm in the South China Sea on the 12th. Forrest continued westward until hitting and crossing the Malay Peninsula on the 15th. It reached a peak of  winds in the Bay of Bengal before hitting Myanmar on the 21st.

At least two people were killed by Tropical Storm Forrest and 31 others were reported missing after a ship capsized.

Typhoon Gay (Seniang) 

Typhoon Gay was the strongest and longest-lasting storm of the season, forming on November 13 near the International Date Line. As it moved to the west, Gay steadily intensified and moved through the Marshall Islands as an intensifying typhoon. After passing through the country, it intensified its peak intensity over open waters. The typhoon briefly re-intensified, although it weakened as it turned toward Japan and became extratropical on November 29.

The typhoon first affected the Marshall Islands, where 5,000 people were left homeless and heavy crop damage was reported. The nation's capital of Majuro lost power during the storm and experienced power and water outages. No Marshall Islands citizens were killed, although the typhoon killed a sailor who was traveling around the world. When Gay struck Guam, it became the sixth typhoon of the year to affect the island. Most of the weaker structures were destroyed during Typhoon Omar earlier in the year. Due to its substantial weakening, Gay had a disrupted inner-core that dropped minimal rainfall, which caused extensive defoliation of plants due to salt water scorching. Further north, the typhoon destroyed a house on Saipan from high waves.

Typhoon Hunt

The last storm of the year formed on November 13 and became extratropical on November 22.

Storm names

During the season 31 named tropical cyclones developed in the Western Pacific and were named by the Joint Typhoon Warning Center, when it was determined that they had become tropical storms. These names were contributed to a revised list which started on mid-1989.

Philippines

The Philippine Atmospheric, Geophysical and Astronomical Services Administration uses its own naming scheme for tropical cyclones in their area of responsibility. PAGASA assigns names to tropical depressions that form within their area of responsibility and any tropical cyclone that might move into their area of responsibility. Should the list of names for a given year prove to be insufficient, names are taken from an auxiliary list, the first 6 of which are published each year before the season starts. Names not retired from this list will be used again in the 1996 season. This is the same list used for the 1988 season, except for Ulpiang and Yerling, which replaced Unsang and Yoning. PAGASA uses its own naming scheme that starts in the Filipino alphabet, with names of Filipino female names ending with "ng" (A, B, K, D, etc.).

Retirement
Due to extensive damage caused by Typhoon Omar in Guam, the name was later retired and was replaced by Oscar and was first used in the 1995 season.

Season effects
This table summarizes all the systems that developed within or moved into the North Pacific Ocean, to the west of the International Date Line during 1992. The tables also provide an overview of a systems intensity, duration, land areas affected and any deaths or damages associated with the system.

|-
| Axel ||  || bgcolor=#| || bgcolor=#| || bgcolor=#| || Marshall Islands, Caroline Islands, Mariana Islands || None || None ||
|-
| Ekeka ||  || bgcolor=#| || bgcolor=#| || bgcolor=#| || Marshall Islands ||  None || None ||
|-
| Bobbie (Asiang) ||  || bgcolor=#| || bgcolor=#| || bgcolor=#| || Philippines, Japan ||  || Unknown ||
|-
| Chuck (Biring) ||  || bgcolor=#| || bgcolor=#| || bgcolor=#| ||  Philippines, South China, Vietnam ||  ||  ||
|-
| Deanna ||  || bgcolor=#| || bgcolor=#| || bgcolor=#| || Caroline Islands || None || None ||
|-
| Eli (Konsing) ||  || bgcolor=#| || bgcolor=#| || bgcolor=#| || Caroline Islands, Philippines, South China, Vietnam ||  ||  ||
|-
| Faye ||  || bgcolor=#| || bgcolor=#| || bgcolor=#| || Philippines, South China ||  None ||  ||
|-
| Gary (Ditang) ||  || bgcolor=#| || bgcolor=#| || bgcolor=#| || Marshall Islands, Caroline Islands, Mariana Islands ||  ||  ||
|-
| Helen ||  || bgcolor=#| || bgcolor=#| || bgcolor=#| || None ||  None || None ||
|-
| TD ||  || bgcolor=#| || bgcolor=#| || bgcolor=#| || None ||  None || None ||
|-
| TD ||  || bgcolor=#| || bgcolor=#| || bgcolor=#| || None ||  None || None ||
|-
| Irving (Edeng) ||  || bgcolor=#| || bgcolor=#| || bgcolor=#| || Japan, South Korea ||  ||  ||
|-
| Janis (Gloring) ||  || bgcolor=#| || bgcolor=#| || bgcolor=#| || Caroline Islands, Mariana Islands, Japan ||  ||  ||
|-
| Kent ||  || bgcolor=#| || bgcolor=#| || bgcolor=#| || Marhsall Islands, Japan || Unknown ||  ||
|-
| Lois (Huaning) ||  || bgcolor=#| || bgcolor=#| || bgcolor=#| || None ||  None || None ||
|-
| Mark ||  || bgcolor=#| || bgcolor=#| || bgcolor=#| || China, Taiwan ||   ||  ||
|-
| Nina ||  || bgcolor=#| || bgcolor=#| || bgcolor=#| || None ||  None || None ||
|-
| TD ||  || bgcolor=#| || bgcolor=#| || bgcolor=#| || Japan ||  None || None ||
|-
| Omar (Lusing) ||  || bgcolor=#| || bgcolor=#| || bgcolor=#| || Marshall Islands, Caroline Islands, Mariana Islands, Philippines, Taiwan, China, Ryukyu Islands ||  ||  ||
|-
| TD ||  || bgcolor=#| || bgcolor=#| || bgcolor=#| || None ||  None || None ||
|-
| Polly (Isang) ||  || bgcolor=#| || bgcolor=#| || bgcolor=#| || Taiwan, Ryukyu Islands, China ||  ||  ||
|-
| Ryan ||  || bgcolor=#| || bgcolor=#| || bgcolor=#| || Mariana Islands || None || None ||
|-
| Sibyl ||  || bgcolor=#| || bgcolor=#| || bgcolor=#| || None || None || None ||
|-
| Ted (Maring) ||  || bgcolor=#| || bgcolor=#| || bgcolor=#| || Philippines, Taiwan, East China, Korean Peninsula  ||  ||  ||
|-
| TD ||  || bgcolor=#| || bgcolor=#| || bgcolor=#| || South China, Vietnam || None || None ||
|-
| Val ||  || bgcolor=#| || bgcolor=#| || bgcolor=#| || None ||  None || None ||
|-
| Ward ||  || bgcolor=#| || bgcolor=#| || bgcolor=#| || None || None || None ||
|-
| TD ||  || bgcolor=#| || bgcolor=#| || bgcolor=#| || Vietnam || None || None ||
|-
| Yvette (Ningning) ||  || bgcolor=#| || bgcolor=#| || bgcolor=#| || Philippines || None || None ||
|-
| Zack ||  || bgcolor=#| || bgcolor=#| || bgcolor=#| || Marshall Islands ||  None || None ||
|-
| Angela (Osang) ||  || bgcolor=#| || bgcolor=#| || bgcolor=#| || Philippines, Vietnam, Cambodia, Thailand, Malaysia || Unknown ||  ||
|-
| Brian ||  || bgcolor=#| || bgcolor=#| || bgcolor=#| || Caroline Islands, Mariana Islands || None || None ||
|-
| Colleen (Paring) ||  || bgcolor=#| || bgcolor=#| || bgcolor=#| || Philippines, Vietnam, Cambodia, Laos, Thailand, Myanmar || Unknown || Unknown ||
|-
| Dan ||  || bgcolor=#| || bgcolor=#| || bgcolor=#| || Marshall Islands || None || None ||
|-
| Elsie (Reming) ||  || bgcolor=#| || bgcolor=#| || bgcolor=#| || Caroline Islands, Mariana Islands || None || None ||
|-
| 29W ||  || bgcolor=#| || bgcolor=#| || bgcolor=#| || None || None || None ||
|-
| TD ||  || bgcolor=#| || bgcolor=#| || bgcolor=#| || Philippines || None || None ||
|-
| Forrest ||  || bgcolor=#| || bgcolor=#| || bgcolor=#| || Vietnam, Thailand, Myanmar ||  None ||  ||
|-
| Gay (Seniang) ||  || bgcolor=#| || bgcolor=#| || bgcolor=#| || Marshall Islands, Caroline Islands, Mariana Islands, Guam, Japan, Aleutian Islands || None ||  ||
|-
| Hunt ||  || bgcolor=#| || bgcolor=#| || bgcolor=#| || Mariana Islands || None || None ||
|-

See also

1992 Pacific hurricane season
1992 Atlantic hurricane season
1992 North Indian cyclone season
 List of wettest tropical cyclones
South-West Indian Ocean cyclone season: 1991–92, 1992–93
Australian region cyclone season: 1991–92, 1992–93
South Pacific cyclone season: 1991–92, 1992–93

References

External links
Satellite movie of the 1992 Pacific typhoon season
Japan Meteorological Agency
Joint Typhoon Warning Center .
China Meteorological Agency
National Weather Service Guam
Hong Kong Observatory
Macau Meteorological Geophysical Services
Korea Meteorological Agency
Philippine Atmospheric, Geophysical and Astronomical Services Administration
Taiwan Central Weather Bureau